Bupleurum angulosum is a species of flowering plant in the family Apiaceae. It is endemic to the Pyrenees and the Cantabrian Mountains in Spain.

References

angulosum
Flora of Spain